Rigters is a Dutch/Surinamese surname. Notable people with the surname include:

 Delano Rigters (born 1956), Surinamese footballer
 Don Rigters (born 1992), Dutch basketball player
 Gregory Rigters (born 1985), Surinamese footballer
 Maceo Rigters (born 1984), Dutch footballer

Dutch-language surnames